Herkimer Creek is a river in Otsego County in the state of New York. It begins west-southwest of the Hamlet of Richfield and northwest of the Hamlet of Dogtown and begins flowing mostly southeast before flowing into Canadarago Lake northeast of the Hamlet of Schuyler Lake.

Fishing
Suckers can be speared and taken from the creek from January 1 to May 15, each year.

References 

Rivers of New York (state)
Rivers of Otsego County, New York